L. Dade Lunsford (born July 25, 1948) is an American neurosurgeon, focusing in brain tumor management, Gamma Knife® stereotactic radiosurgery, movement disorders and trigeminal neuralgia and vascular malformations, currently the Lars Leksell Distinguished Professor at University of Pittsburgh. He is the 2017 recipient of the Herbert Olivecrona Award.

References

American neurosurgeons
University of Pittsburgh faculty
Columbia University Vagelos College of Physicians and Surgeons alumni
Living people
1948 births